Fotbal Club Bârlad was a Romanian professional football club from Bârlad, Vaslui County, Romania, founded in 2005 and dissolved in 2009.

History
In 2007, Bârlădenii, won the Liga IV – Vaslui County and promoted to Liga III after a promotion play-off against champions of Liga IV – Botoșani County, Avântul Albești (2–0 at Pașcani).

Ground

The club played its home matches on Fepa 74 Stadium in Bârlad, with a capacity of 2,000 people.

Honours
Liga IV – Vaslui County
Winners (1): 2006–07

Former players
 Bogdan Ghiceanu
 Sorin Ungurianu
 Alin Abuzătoaie
 Ionuț Plăcintă

Former managers
 Costinel Botez

League history

References

Bârlad
Association football clubs established in 2005
Defunct football clubs in Romania
Football clubs in Vaslui County
Association football clubs disestablished in 2009
Liga III clubs
2005 establishments in Romania
2009 disestablishments in Romania